Hyperfrontia is a genus of moths of the family Noctuidae.

Type species
 Hyperfrontia direae Berio, 1962

Species
Some species of this genus are:

 Hyperfrontia direae Berio, 1962
 Hyperfrontia kitenga 	Berio, 1977
 Hyperfrontia limbata 	Berio, 1962
 Hyperfrontia lory 	Berio, 1966
 Hyperfrontia semicirculosa (Gaede, 1935)

References

Natural History Museum Lepidoptera genus database

Noctuinae